Kandia Subdivision consists of five Union Councils, i.e Karang, Thoti, Kareen, Jashoi and Gabrial in Kohistan Upper Khyberpakhtunkhawa in Pakistan having a population of approximately 84,055 according to Census 2017. The Detail of Union Councils is that Karang has four Villages, i.e Village council Dansh, village council Karang Khas, village council Berti and  village council Bagroo. Union council Garial has six  villages, i.e Nakao, mirshahi, mulakhel Gabrial, Shadomkhel Gabrial, Village bagh seri and village council Barigo. Union council Kareen has two villages, i.e village council Kareen and Village council Sergarhi. Union council Jashoi has three villages, i.e Seyal khas Dong, Siyal Dara and Jajshoi. Union council Thoti has four villages, i.e Kafarbanda, Eleel, Serto and Thoti. There are many tourist points in Thoti Union council also.

Lekhi Thoti Dara:

This Darra (Valley) has dense forests, vast plains, picturesque waterfalls, noisy waters, beautiful large pastures, high mountains, beautiful lakes where fishing and camping facilities are also available. Seri, Rong, Gunbelo, Dhand, etc. are seen inviting tourists with their beauty.
The Kandia was created as a tehsil upon the splitting-away of the Kandia valley from the Dassu tehsil administration area, 23 km away. It was upgraded to a subdivision on 31 May 2018. Kandia is part of the Upper Kohistan District, and the Kandia valley merges with the Indus.

The Kandia valley
The Kandia valley road follows the Kandia Nuddi watercourse (21° 19' 60 N, 86° 55' 0 E), 371 km from the capital Islamabad. It abuts Ghizer (Shoundoor) on the North, Kalam on the south, and Tashkand on the east. The valley four Union Councils i.e. UC Thoti, UC Kareen, UC Jashoi, UC Karang and UC Gabral. According to 2017 census the total population of the valley is 84400. The valley of the Kandia is prone to natural disasters, primarily avalanches and flooding; in August 2011 over 60 people were killed and hundreds of farm livestock swept away by floods. The Kandia valley road was washed away by extensive flooding, making access to the valley extremely difficult; a  road was constructed and carpeted by ERRA amounting to Rs.805 million. After the flood of July 2010, all the road has totally washed away and the access of the inhabitants were too difficult to the main market (Komila), so many diseases attacked the people and died before any health treatments.

References

Tehsils of Khyber Pakhtunkhwa
Populated places in Upper Kohistan District